The Bolshaya (upstream from its confluence with the Plotnikova: Быстрая Bystraya) is a river in the western Kamchatka Peninsula, Russia. It is used for spawning by various species of Pacific salmon.

Course

The Bolshaya is the largest river on the west of the Kamchatka Peninsula.
It rises in the southern end of the Eastern Range (Ganal Range), as does the river Kamchatka, which flows to the east.
The sources of the Bolshaya are in the Ganalsky Range.
The upper part is called the Bystraya.

There are many other tributaries, including the Nachilova and Goltsovka.
The basin has more than one thousand lakes.
There are  mineral springs in the basin, including the notable Malkinskoye deposit.
The mountains of the upper basin have exposed crystalline rocks, while lower down the land is mostly covered in peat.
The banks are lined with typical Kamchatka forest, with birch and dwarf cedar.

It forms the Bolshaya Lake at its mouth.
It flows in a generally southwesterly direction to the coast, where it turns and flows in a SSE direction for about  along the east side of a narrow sand and gravel spit before emptying into the Sea of Okhotsk at the end of the spit.
Large boats could navigate the river to within eight miles of the town.
According to the United States Hydrographic Office (1932):

Settlements

The village of Malka is on left bank of the upper part of the river.
The first use of the name Malka is by the French traveler Barthélemy de Lesseps in 1787. 
He said it had five or six huts and 15 sheds, on the bank of the Bystraya, surrounded by high mountains, with a hot spring nearby.

In the late 1920s the people of that village on the islands decided to relocate to a more convenient location on the Kavalerskaya channel six miles down the river. In the spring of 1928, there were already three houses on the Kavalerskaya channel, two more were under construction.
The new village was formed by 1930. Until 1990, it was called the Bolsheretsky state farm after its location on the right bank of the Bolshaya. In 1990 it was renamed Kavalerskoye.

Russian exploration

Russian explorers led by Vladimir Atlasov reached the river at the end of the 17th century and the first map of the region was based on their accounts.
The Cossack geographer Semyon Remezov mentioned the river at the start of the 18th century, calling it "Kiksha". 
This is probably close to the original Itelmen language name, from the word "kyg", which means "river".
Reka Bolshaya means "Big River" in Russian.
The name Bolshaya was given in the 18th century to distinguish it from the other, smaller rivers in the region.

The estuary was used as a sanctuary by sailors, who would enter at high tide.
When the tide fell the boats would rest on their sides, but the soft bottom saved them from damage.
The German geologist and traveler Karl von Dietmar, who visited the region in the middle of the 19th century, noted that the mouth of the river had been relocated to the north by the local people before the Russians arrived so the fish would follow a route that made them easier to catch.
There were a number of shipwrecks at the mouth of the river in the 18th century, including the galliot "Okhotsk" and the flotilla of three ships commanded by Lieutenant V. Khmetevsky.

Fish

In the summer pink salmon, chinook salmon, coho salmon, sockeye salmon and arctic char spawn in the river.
Historically the Bolshaya has been one of the world's most productive wild salmon rivers, with diverse salmon species.
It is one of the main chum salmon rivers in west Kamchatka, along with the Icha and Kikhchik rivers.
These three rivers are also the main coho streams in the region.
Pink salmon spawn in the Bolshaya  from the sea.
In years with large runs they go further upstream than in years when the runs are smaller.

Most of the 320,000 inhabitants of the Kamchatka Peninsula live in the south, near to the Bolshaya.
The river has provided a vital source of food and work for many local communities.
In addition to commercial fishing, amateur fishing is also widespread.
In the decades leading up to 2010 there have been high levels of blatantly illegal fishing, uncontrolled by the corrupt law enforcement and fishery agencies, and threatening the fish stocks.
In 2011 a public salmon council was created in Ust-Bolsheretsky District to protect the salmon of the lower Bolshaya basin, and in 2013 a second council was created to protect the upper part of the basin.
These councils have been active in combating poaching and restoring sustainable fishing practices.

Notes

Citations

Sources

Rivers of Kamchatka Krai
Drainage basins of the Sea of Okhotsk